Charles Hatch Taylor (November 20, 1813January 9, 1889) was an American politician who served as the Michigan Secretary of State.

Early life
Charles H. Taylor was born on November 20, 1813, in Cooperstown, New York, to parents Elisha and Aurelia Taylor. In New York, Charles received an education at an academy. Charles settled in Grand Rapids, Michigan, in 1837.

Career
Taylor served as the clerk of Kent County, Michigan, for eight years. On November 2, 1846, Prosser was elected to the Michigan House of Representatives where he represented the Kent and Ottawa County district from January 4, 1847, to April 3, 1848. Taylor served as one of five commissioners who chose the location of the insane asylum in Kalamazoo, Michigan, and the deaf and dumb asylum in Flint, Michigan. Taylor edited the Grand Rapids Enquirer from 1847 to 1855. Taylor served as Michigan Secretary of State from 1850 to 1852. He was the first secretary of state elected under the 1850 Michigan Constitution. In 1861, Taylor became chief editor of the Detroit Free Press but retired the position due to poor health in 1862.

Personal life
Charles H. Taylor was married to Abigail M. Taylor. Together, they had four children.

Taylor died on January 9, 1889, in Kent County. He lived in Grand Rapids at the time of his death. He was interred at the Fulton Street Cemetery in Grand Rapids.

References

1813 births
1889 deaths
Burials in Michigan
Detroit Free Press people
People from Cooperstown, New York
Politicians from Grand Rapids, Michigan
Democratic Party members of the Michigan House of Representatives
Secretaries of State of Michigan
19th-century American politicians